Parornix anglicella is a moth of the family Gracillariidae. It is widespread in: Europe including Albania, Austria, Belarus, Belgium, Bosnia and Herzegovina, Britain, Bulgaria, Croatia, Corsica, Czech Republic, Danish mainland, Estonia, Finland, French mainland, Germany, Hungary, Ireland, Italian mainland, Latvia, Lithuania, Luxembourg, Montenegro, North Macedonia, Norwegian mainland, Poland, Portuguese mainland, Romania, central and northern Russia, Sardinia, Serbia, Sicily, Slovakia, Slovenia, Sweden, Switzerland, Netherlands, Ukraine. Outside Europe it is recorded from the Near East and Nearctic realm.

The wingspan is 9–11 mm. The head is ochreous-whitish mixed with fuscous. Palpi white, apex of second joint and median band of terminal dark fuscous. Forewings are dark fuscous, irrorated with whitish ; numerous costal strigulae, a spot in middle of disc and another
posteriorly, and suffused dorsal strigidae interrupted by two blackish spots white ; a black apical dot ; cilia with three entire dark fuscous lines. Hindwings are grey. The larva is pale greenish-grey ; dorsal line darker ; spots pale ; head pale greenish-brown ; segment 2 with four black spots.

Adults are on wing in two generations in April and May and again in August.

The caterpillars usually feed on Crataegus species, but have also been recorded on Mespilus germanica, Sorbus aucuparia and Fragaria species.

References

External links
 
 
 UKmoths
 Image of Larva 

Parornix
Moths described in 1850
Moths of Asia
Moths of Europe
Taxa named by Henry Tibbats Stainton